The Savannah Ghost Pirates are a professional minor league ice hockey team in the ECHL based in Savannah, Georgia.  The team began play in the 2022–23 ECHL season with home games at the Enmarket Arena.

History
On May 19, 2022, the Ghost Pirates announced a one-year affiliation for the 2022–23 season with the Vegas Golden Knights of the National Hockey League (NHL), as well as their American Hockey League (AHL) affiliate, the Henderson Silver Knights. Additionally, former NHL player and Union Dutchmen head coach Rick Bennett was announced as Savannah's first head coach. 

The team plays in the South Division, with the Atlanta Gladiators, Florida Everblades, Greenville Swamp Rabbits, Jacksonville Icemen, Orlando Solar Bears, and the South Carolina Stingrays, and potentially the expansion Athens ECHL team in 2023-24 barring division realignment. The expansion of Savannah into the league sent the Norfolk Admirals into the North Division, now letting all divisions have 7 teams.

Season-by-season record
Note: GP = Games played, W = Wins, L = Losses, OTL = Overtime losses, SOL = shootout losses, Pts = Points, GF = Goals for, GA = Goals against, PIM = Penalties in minutes

Players

Current roster
Updated March 1, 2023

References

External links
 

ECHL teams
Ice hockey clubs established in 2021
Ice hockey teams in Georgia (U.S. state)
Sports teams in Savannah, Georgia
2021 establishments in Georgia (U.S. state)
 Vegas Golden Knights minor league affiliates